Rosocha may refer to the following places:
Rosocha, Kalisz County in Greater Poland Voivodeship (west-central Poland)
Rosocha, Łódź Voivodeship (central Poland)
Rosocha, Masovian Voivodeship (east-central Poland)
Rosocha, Konin County in Greater Poland Voivodeship (west-central Poland)
Rosocha, Koło County in Greater Poland Voivodeship (west-central Poland)
Rosocha, Warmian-Masurian Voivodeship (north Poland)
Rosocha, West Pomeranian Voivodeship (north-west Poland)

See also
 Rossocha, a village in Gmina Rawa Mazowiecka, Rawa County, Łódź Voivodeship, central Poland